Marquess of Griñón is a title in the Peerage of Spain. It was created by Queen Isabella II in 1862 for María Cristina Fernández de Córdoba (1862-1917), daughter of the 6th Duke of Arión.

The name of the title refers to the municipality of Griñón in the Community of Madrid.

The 5th Marquess, Carlos Falcó, had held the title since 9 December 1955 and died on 20 March 2020 due to COVID-19. He was succeeded by his second daughter, Tamara Falcó, from his second wife, Isabel Preysler.

Marquesses of Griñón (1862)

 María Cristina Fernández de Córdoba y Álvarez de las Asturias-Bohorques, 1st Marchioness of Griñón (1831-1916)
 Joaquín Fernando Fernández de Córdoba y Osma, 2nd Marquess of Griñón (1870-1957)
 Gonzalo Joaquín Fernández de Córdoba y Mariátegui, 3rd Marquess of Griñón (1913-1934)
 Joaquín Fernando Fernandéz de Córdoba y Osma, 4th Marquess of Griñón (1870-1957)
 Carlos Falcó y Fernández de Córdoba, 5th Marquess of Griñón (1937-2020)
 Tamara Isabel Falcó y Preysler, 6th Marchioness of Griñón (b. 1981)
The heir presumptive to the title is the 5th Marquess' younger son and the present holder's paternal half-brother, Duarte Falcó.

See also
Marquess of Castel Moncayo

References

Marquesses of Spain
Lists of Spanish nobility
Noble titles created in 1862